The La Leona River is a river of Patagonia, Argentina. It flows in the eastern part of the Los Glaciares National Park. It has its origin to the south of Lake Viedma and winds for about 50 kilometers (30 miles) through the Andes before flowing into Lake Argentino.

See also
List of rivers of Argentina

References

Rivers of Santa Cruz Province, Argentina
Rivers of Argentina